WhatShed is a British website that reviews and compares prices in the UK garden market. WhatShed was founded by Richard Fletcher in 2014. This website uses technology and industry experts to track and analyse market data. WhatShed designs and tests gardening products.

References 

British websites